The Geikie River is a river in northern Canadian province of Saskatchewan. Its source is Costigan Lake located near the uranium producing areas around the Key Lake mine in the Athabasca Basin and flows in a north-easterly direction to drain into Wollaston Lake.

As the primary inflow of Wollaston Lake, the largest natural bifurcation lake in the world, the Geikie River's most unusual feature is that it straddles a major drainage divide which separates waters flowing into Hudson Bay from those flowing into the Arctic Ocean.

From Wollaston Lake, waters from the Geikie River can flow into either the Fond du Lac River which flows out of the lake to the north-west where it drains into Lake Athabasca which ultimately drains into the Arctic Ocean via the Mackenzie River system, or into the Cochrane River which flows out of the north-eastern side of the lake and into Reindeer Lake which drains via the Churchill River system into Hudson Bay. If Hudson Bay is defined as part of the Atlantic Ocean then the Geikie River is the largest river in the world that drains naturally into two oceans.

Geikie River Recreation Site 
Geikie River Recreation Site (57°42′23″N, 103°57′5″W), also called Geikie River Campground, is a provincially run park on the north side of the Geikie River, near its mouth. The campground features 8 campsites, a boat launch, and a fish cleaning station. It is located along Highway 905 at the highway's 184 kilometre mark, 30 km south of Wollaston Lake Landing and 210 km north of the community of Southend.

See also
List of rivers of Saskatchewan
Hudson Bay drainage basin

References

External links 

 Geikie River description from Big Sandy Lake to Wollaston Lake

Rivers of Saskatchewan
Tributaries of Hudson Bay